Enoksen is a surname. Notable persons with that name include:

Hans Enoksen (born 1956), Greenlandic politician
Henning Enoksen (1935–2016), Danish football player
Lars Magnar Enoksen (born 1960), Swedish writer and Glima wrestler
Odd Roger Enoksen (born 1954), Norwegian politician